"Drums of Tombalku" is an American fantasy short story, one of the original ones written in the 1930s by Robert E. Howard featuring Conan the Cimmerian.  Howard left it as an untitled synopsis which was not published in his lifetime. The tale was finalized by L. Sprague de Camp and in this form first published in the collection Conan the Adventurer (1966).  It has first been published in its original form in the collection The Pool of the Black One (Donald M. Grant, 1986) and later in The Conan Chronicles Volume 1: The People of the Black Circle (Gollancz, 2000) and Conan of Cimmeria: Volume Two (1934) (Del Rey, 2005).

Adaptation
The story was adapted in the comic book Savage Sword of Conan #21, under the title "The Horror from the Red Tower".

Synopsis 
A nobleman, Amalric, arrives at a desert oasis with two companions from a bandit tribe, Gobir and Saidu. A third member of the tribe, a giant named Tilutan arrives with an unconscious girl slumped across his saddle. As he is trying to revive her, the other 2 bandits ask who will rape her after Tilutan. Amalric feigns indifferences and tells them to gamble for it. As they are bent over the dice Amalric kills Gobir, and in the ensuing struggle kills the other 2 as well, before passing out.

He wakes to the girl splashing him with water, finding out that her name is Lissa and that she is far more beautiful and innocent than he had previously thought. Her innocence makes him decide not to rape her, as had been his plan when killing his three companions. She tells him that she is from a city called Gazal, which she ran away from before falling unconscious from lack of water. The two set off towards the city, arriving at dawn to a mass of ruins. The only building left standing is a single tower, which seems to terrify Lissa. There are people in the city, daydreamers and poets of a dwindling race, although they are not attacked by marauding tribes because they worship the thing that lurks in the tower.

Amalric and Lissa begin sleeping together, and talk about their lives. He was part of an army that came to conquer the land before it was betrayed and wiped out, although he managed to escape with Conan, who was later cut down when they were attacked. Suddenly, they hear an awful cry from nearby, and Lissa, terrified, tells Amalric about a supernatural monster that lives in the tower, which leaves occasionally to devour one of the city’s inhabitants. Amalric believes that the city’s inhabitants have fallen under some sort of spell and that they should leave immediately. Whilst he is packing the horse he hears Lissa scream, and rushes back to the room to find her gone.

He rushes to the tower, sure that she has been taken by the creature, and meets a man of strange beauty in the upper chambers. Not fooled, he casts a spell to hold the demon in human form, and after a great battle, stabs the creature through the heart and kills it. With its dying breath it screams for vengeance and disembodied voices answer. At the bottom of the stairs he meets Lissa, who was not dead but had run away after seeing the creature dragging its prey away. They hastened out of the city, chased across the desert by 7 robed, inhuman riders. Finding no water, their animals began to falter around dusk, and their pursuers gained ground. Finally, Lissa’s animal stumbled and fell. Just as the riders were about to fall upon them, they were swept away by a band of horsemen.

The leader of the horsemen turns out to be Conan, who had been captured by the men who were now his companions. The men were from Tombalku, and had taken Conan to their kings, who had condemned him to die of torture. However, one of the kings recognised him, had him freed and raised to a high position in the army. He explains the political make up of Tombalku to Almaric as they ride towards the city. On arrival they find tensions in the city boiling over, and a bloody civil war ensues. Conan and his allies win, their enemies either killed or sent into exile in the desert, and he takes the throne beside the king who had saved him. However, a priest accuses Almaric of killing their god and demands he and Lissa be tortured to death. Conan refuses and chaos erupts. Conan, Almaric, and Lissa manage to escape as the exiled tribes attack the city, and Tombalku collapses into fire and blood.

References

External links
 Conan the Barbarian at AmratheLion.com
 Conan.com: The Official Website

Conan the Barbarian stories by Robert E. Howard
Pulp stories
Horror short stories
Fantasy short stories
1966 short stories
Short stories published posthumously